The 23rd Saturn Awards, honoring the best in science fiction, fantasy and horror film and television in 1996, were held on July 23, 1997.

Below is a complete list of nominees and winners. Winners are highlighted in bold.

Winners and nominees

Film

{| class=wikitable
|-
! style="background:#EEDD82; width:50%" | Best Science Fiction Film
! style="background:#EEDD82; width:50%" | Best Fantasy Film
|-
| valign="top" |
 Independence Day
 Escape from L.A.
 The Island of Dr. Moreau
 Mars Attacks!
 Mystery Science Theater 3000: The Movie
 Star Trek: First Contact
| valign="top" |
 Dragonheart
 The Adventures of Pinocchio
 The Hunchback of Notre Dame
 James and the Giant Peach
 Matilda
 The Nutty Professor
 Phenomenon
|-
! style="background:#EEDD82; width:50%" | Best Horror Film
! style="background:#EEDD82; width:50%" | Best Action/Adventure/Thriller Film
|-
| valign="top" |
 Scream
 Cemetery Man
 The Craft
 Curdled
 The Frighteners
 The Relic
| valign="top" |
 Fargo
 Bound
 Mission: Impossible
 Ransom
 The Rock
 Twister
|-
! style="background:#EEDD82; width:50%" | Best Actor
! style="background:#EEDD82; width:50%" | Best Actress
|-
| valign="top" |
 Eddie Murphy – The Nutty Professor as Sherman Klump / Buddy Love / Lance Perkins / Papa Klump / Mama Klump / Grandma Klump / Ernie Klump
 Michael J. Fox – The Frighteners as Frank Bannister
 Jeff Goldblum – Independence Day as David Levinson
 Bill Paxton – Twister as Bill Harding
 Will Smith – Independence Day as Capt. Steven Hiller
 Patrick Stewart – Star Trek: First Contact as Jean-Luc Picard
| valign="top" |
 Neve Campbell – Scream as Sidney Prescott
 Geena Davis – The Long Kiss Goodnight as Samantha Caine (Charly)
 Gina Gershon – Bound as Corky
 Helen Hunt – Twister as Dr. Joanne "Jo" Harding
 Frances McDormand – Fargo as Marge Gunderson
 Penelope Ann Miller – The Relic as Dr. Margo Green
|-
! style="background:#EEDD82; width:50%" | Best Supporting Actor
! style="background:#EEDD82; width:50%" | Best Supporting Actress
|-
| valign="top" |
 Brent Spiner – Star Trek: First Contact as Data
 Jeffrey Combs – The Frighteners as Milton Dammers
 Edward Norton – Primal Fear as Aaron Stampler / Roy
 Joe Pantoliano – Bound as Caesar
 Brent Spiner – Independence Day as Dr. Brakish Okun
 Skeet Ulrich – Scream as Billy Loomis
| valign="top" |
 Alice Krige – Star Trek: First Contact as Borg Queen
 Fairuza Balk – The Island of Dr. Moreau as Aissa
 Drew Barrymore – Scream as Casey Becker
 Glenn Close – Mars Attacks! as First Lady Marsha Dale
 Pam Ferris – Matilda as Agatha Trunchbull
 Vivica A. Fox – Independence Day as Jasmine Dubrow
 Jennifer Tilly – Bound as Violet
|-
! style="background:#EEDD82; width:50%" | Best Performance by a Younger Actor
! style="background:#EEDD82; width:50%" | Best Director
|-
| valign="top" |
 Lucas Black – Sling Blade as Frank Wheatly Kevin Bishop – Muppet Treasure Island as Jim Hawkins
 James Duval – Independence Day as Miguel
 Lukas Haas – Mars Attacks! as Richie Norris
 Jonathan Taylor Thomas – The Adventures of Pinocchio as Pinocchio
 Mara Wilson – Matilda as Matilda Wormwood
| valign="top" |
 Roland Emmerich – Independence Day Tim Burton – Mars Attacks!
 Joel Coen – Fargo
 Wes Craven – Scream
 Jonathan Frakes – Star Trek: First Contact
 Peter Jackson – The Frighteners
|-
! style="background:#EEDD82; width:50%" | Best Writing
! style="background:#EEDD82; width:50%" | Best Costumes
|-
| valign="top" |
 Kevin Williamson – Scream Brannon Braga and Ronald D. Moore – Star Trek: First Contact
 Dean Devlin and Roland Emmerich – Independence Day
 Jonathan Gems – Mars Attacks!
 The Wachowskis – Bound
 Fran Walsh and Peter Jackson – The Frighteners
| valign="top" |
 Star Trek: First Contact – Deborah Everton Dragonheart – Thomas Casterline and Anna B. Sheppard
 Escape from L.A. – Robin Michel Bush
 Independence Day – Joseph A. Porro
 Mars Attacks! – Colleen Atwood
 Romeo + Juliet – Kym Barrett
|-
! style="background:#EEDD82; width:50%" | Best Make-up
! style="background:#EEDD82; width:50%" | Best Music
|-
| valign="top" |
 The Nutty Professor – Rick Baker and David LeRoy Anderson The Frighteners – Rick Baker and Richard Taylor
 The Island of Dr. Moreau – Stan Winston and Shane Mahan
 Mary Reilly – Jenny Shircore and Peter Owen
 Star Trek: First Contact – Michael Westmore, Scott Wheeler, and Jake Garber
 Thinner – Greg Cannom
| valign="top" |
 Danny Elfman – Mars Attacks! David Arnold – Independence Day
 Randy Edelman – Dragonheart
 Danny Elfman – The Frighteners
 Jerry Goldsmith – Star Trek: First Contact
 Nick Glennie-Smith, Hans Zimmer, and Harry Gregson-Williams – The Rock
|-
! style="background:#EEDD82; width:50%" | Best Special Effects
! style="background:#EEDD82; width:50%" | Best Home Video Release
|-
| valign="top" |
 Independence Day – Volker Engel, Clay Pinney, Douglas Smith, and Joe Viskocil Dragonheart – Scott Squires, Phil Tippett, James Straus, and Kit West
 The Frighteners – Wes Takahashi, Charlie McClellan, and Richard Taylor
 Mars Attacks! – Jim Mitchell, Michael L. Fink, David Andrews, and Michael Lantieri (Industrial Light & Magic (ILM), Warner Digital Studios)
 Star Trek: First Contact – John Knoll (Industrial Light & Magic (ILM))
 Twister – Stefen Fangmeier, John Frazier, Habib Zargarpour, and Henry LaBounta
| valign="top" |
 The Arrival' La machine Necronomicon: Book of Dead Pinocchio's Revenge Tremors 2: Aftershocks Within the Rock|}

Television

Programs

Acting

Special awards
George Pal Memorial Award
 Kathleen Kennedy

Life Career Award
 Dino De Laurentiis
 John Frankenheimer
 Sylvester Stallone

President's Award
 Billy Bob Thornton

Service Award
 Edward Russell

Special Award
 Star Wars'' (for its 20th anniversary)

References

External links
 Official website

Saturn Awards ceremonies
1997 awards
1997 film awards
1997 television awards